Tiruvallur railway station is one of the railway stations of the Chennai Central–Arakkonam section of the Chennai Suburban Railway Network. It is one of the terminal and oldest stations in the network where some of the suburban trains originate and terminate. It serves the neighbourhood of Tiruvallur, a suburb of Chennai, and is located 41 km west of the Chennai Central railway station. It has an elevation of 47.46 m above sea level.

History
The lines at the station were electrified on 29 November 1979, with the electrification of the Chennai Central–Tiruvallur section.

Traffic
As of 2018, the station handles about 100,000 passengers a day.

See also

 Chennai Suburban Railway

References

Stations of Chennai Suburban Railway
Railway stations in Tiruvallur district
Tiruvallur